Chris Rossouw is a South African rugby union player, born 14 November 1976 in Bellville (South Africa). He has played for the South Africa national rugby union team and plays as fly half for the Free State Cheetahs (1.87 m and 92 kg). He is the brother of ex-Springbok wing and current backline coach of the Bulls, Pieter Rossouw.

Career

Club 
 2005 - 2008 : RC Toulonnais

Province 
 1997-2005 : Western Province (1997- under 21, 1998 and 1999- reserves, played in Currie Cup) 
 Since 2008 : Free State Cheetahs

Franchise 
 2001-2005 : Stormers (Super 12)

Honours

Club 
 Rugby Pro D2 : 2008

Province 
 Winner of Currie Cup : 2000, 2001 with Western Province

National team 
 5 caps for South Africa national rugby union team

External links 
  Player profile at lequipe.fr
  Statistics at itsrugby.fr
  
 

South African rugby union players
South Africa international rugby union players
Rugby union fly-halves
1976 births
Living people
Stormers players
Western Province (rugby union) players
Free State Cheetahs players
Alumni of Paarl Gimnasium
Rugby union players from the Western Cape